Khan Mohammad (Punjabi) (1 January 1928 – 4 July 2009) was a cricket player who was a member of Pakistan's first Test team that played against India in 1952. Born in Lahore, Punjab, he was educated at the city's Islamia College. He played in 13 Tests as an opening bowler who shared the new ball with Fazal Mahmood. He also holds the distinction of bowling Pakistan's first ball and taking Pakistan's first wicket in Test cricket.

He even once bowled Len Hutton in a Test match for a duck, at Lord's in 1954 – a rare feat among the cricketers of that time.

In 1951, Khan Mohammad made one appearance for Somerset, playing against the South Africans. He took five wickets in the match, and the intention appears to have been for him to qualify for the county by residence, which would have taken three years by the then rules, but he returned to Pakistan when Test cricket started there 18 months later. He chose country over county, as his newly founded nation desperately needed experienced cricketers.

Khan Mohammad, who had been living in England during the last four decades, died of prostate cancer in London on 4 July 2009.

References

External links

Pakistan Cricket Board profile

1928 births
2009 deaths
Deaths from prostate cancer
Deaths from cancer in England
Pakistan Test cricketers
Somerset cricketers
Commonwealth XI cricketers
Punjabi people
Pakistani cricketers
Punjab University cricketers
Punjab (Pakistan) cricketers
Bahawalpur cricketers
Sindh cricketers
Lahore cricketers
Karachi Whites cricketers
Pakistan Universities cricketers
Cricketers from Lahore
Northern India cricketers
Government Islamia College alumni
People from Lahore